Paul Halke (1866, Bukowiec - 1924) was a German artist and illustrator.

He exhibited in the Große Berliner Kunstausstellung (the “Grand Berlin Art Exhibition”) in 1894 and 1914.

His son, the photographer Heinz Hajek-Halke, was born in Berlin in 1898. After spending several years in Argentina, Paul's son returned to Germany in 1911, where he was taught drawing by Paul.

References

1866 births
1924 deaths
German artists
German cartoonists